Alan Ruslanovich Khabalov (born 27 May 1995) is a Russian football midfielder. He plays for FC Alania Vladikavkaz.

Club career
He made his debut in the Russian Second Division for FC Alania-d Vladikavkaz on 12 July 2013 in a game against FC Gazprom transgaz Stavropol Ryzdvyany.

References

External links
 
 Career summary by sportbox.ru
 

1995 births
Sportspeople from Vladikavkaz
Living people
Russian footballers
Association football midfielders
S.C. Farense players
F.C. Tirsense players
FC Khimki players
FC Mashuk-KMV Pyatigorsk players
FC Spartak Vladikavkaz players
Liga Portugal 2 players
Campeonato de Portugal (league) players
Russian First League players
Russian Second League players
Russian expatriate footballers
Expatriate footballers in Portugal
Russian expatriate sportspeople in Portugal